The 2019 Speedway Grand Prix season was the 25th season of the Speedway Grand Prix era, and decided the 74th FIM Speedway World Championship. It was the nineteenth series under the promotion of Benfield Sports International, an IMG company.

The title was won by Bartosz Zmarzlik, who beat debutant Leon Madsen by two points with Russia's Emil Sayfutdinov finishing third. Zmarzlik became the third Polish world champion after Jerzy Szczakiel won in 1973 and Tomasz Gollob took the title in 2010. Defending champion Tai Woffinden's season was hampered by injury and he finished in 13th place.

2019 changes
Qualifying for each Grand Prix was introduced for the first time in the 2019 season. On the day before the Grand Prix every rider completed a timed lap, with the fastest rider getting to select their position in the draw, followed by second and so on. Matej Žagar was the first ever rider to win a qualifying session when setting the fastest time at the 2019 Speedway Grand Prix of Poland.

Qualification 
For the 2019 season there were 15 permanent riders, joined at each Grand Prix by one wild card and two track reserves.

The top eight riders from the 2018 championship qualified automatically. These riders were joined by the three riders who qualified via the Grand Prix Challenge.

The final four riders were nominated by series promoters, Benfield Sports International, following the completion of the 2018 season.

On May 2 Greg Hancock announced he would not be competing in the 2019 season to support his wife's battle with cancer. The FIM and BSI unanimously supported Hancock's withdrawal.

Qualified riders

Qualified substitutes 

The following riders were nominated as substitutes:

Calendar

The 2019 season consisted of 10 events, the same number as in 2018.

Final Classification

See also 
 2019 Individual Speedway Junior World Championship

References

External links 
 SpeedwayGP.com – Speedway World Championships

 
2019
Grand Prix